The Castilla y León Cup 2010–11 (Spanish: Copa Castilla y León 2010–11) is the second edition of this football trophy in its renewed version. It was organized before the final match of the previous cup, twice postponed because of Liga BBVA and Liga Adelante matchdays schedules.

Teams participants

Group stage

Group A

Group B

Group C

Group D

Final round

Semifinals

Final
The final match was originally scheduled for the festivity of Castilla y León (23 April). However, the match was postponed until both teams were available because the original date was reserved to one Liga Adelante matchday. After finishing the league season, with both finalists relegated to Segunda División B, the final was played at El Toralín on 7 June.

References

See also
Castilla y León Cup
2009–10 Castilla y León Cup
2010–11 Real Valladolid season

Castilla y León Cup
2010–11 in Spanish football cups